Grout is a construction material. 

Grout may also refer to:

People
 Abel Joel Grout, (1867–1947), American botanist
 Daniel A. Grout (1862-1929), Canadian-born educator in Portland, Oregon
 Donald Jay Grout (1902-1987), American musicologist
 Edward M. Grout (1861–1931), American lawyer and New York City Comptroller
 Jack Grout (1910-1989), American professional golfer best known as the ‘first and only’ golf teacher of Jack Nicklaus
 James Grout (born 1927), English television and radio actor
 John William Grout (1843–1861), American Civil War officer about whom the poem "The Vacant Chair" was written
 Jonathan Grout (1737–1807), United States Representative from Massachusetts 
 Josiah Grout (1842-1925), American Civil War veteran, lawyer, politician, and Governor of Vermont
 W. H. J. Grout (1839-1915), British inventor and manufacturer of high wheel bicycles
 Wally Grout (1927-1968), Test cricketer for Australia and Queensland
 William W. Grout (1836-1902), U.S. Representative from Vermont
 William L. Grout (1833-1908), American industrialist and co-founder of the White Sewing Machine Company (ancestor of the White Motor Company)
 C. B. Grout, American industrialist and co-founder of the Grout Brothers Automobile Co. (1900-1912); son of William L. Grout
 Carl Grout, American industrialist and co-founder of the Grout Brothers Automobile Co.; son of William L. Grout
 Fred Grout, American industrialist and co-founder of the Grout Brothers Automobile Co.; son of William L. Grout

Other uses
 Grout (automobile), early automobiles manufactured by the Grout brothers in Orange, Massachusetts
 Grout Township, Michigan, United States
 Harry Grout, a character in the BBC sitcom Porridge